Ghiasi is a village in Iran. Ghiasi may also refer to

Other villages in Iran
Mazraeh-ye Ghiasi
Tolombeh-ye Mohammad Ali Ghiasi, Fars
Tolombeh-ye Mohammad Ali Ghiasi, Kerman

Other uses
Teymour Ghiasi (born 1946), Iranian high jumper